Larry Dean McWilliams (born February 10, 1954) is an American former professional baseball pitcher, who played in Major League Baseball (MLB) for the Atlanta Braves (twice), Pittsburgh Pirates, St. Louis Cardinals, Philadelphia Phillies, and Kansas City Royals, from -.

Early life
After attending Paris Junior College in Paris, Texas, the Atlanta Braves selected the tall, lanky left-hander in the 1st round (6th overall pick) of the January phase of the 1974 Major League Baseball draft.

Professional baseball
McWilliams was drafted sixth overall by the Atlanta Braves in the 1974 January draft and made his major league debut on July 17, 1978. On August 1, 1978, in what was just the fourth start of McWilliams’ first MLB campaign, he was the winning pitcher (raising his record to 4–0), when the Braves stopped Pete Rose's 44-game hitting streak at Atlanta-Fulton County Stadium.

McWilliams made what was probably the key defensive play to stop the streak when, with two outs in the bottom of the second inning, Rose, in his second plate appearance of the game, lined a pitch up the middle that McWilliams reached back and caught.

He was nicknamed Spaghetti, by Pirates catcher Tony Pena. "That's what I call him. Take a look at his legs. They look like spaghetti.

On September 2, 1989, McWilliams was traded from the Philadelphia Phillies to the Kansas City Royals for Minor League Baseball (MiLB) catcher Jeff Hulse. McWilliams retired, after being released by the Royals on May 14, .

Personal life
McWilliams and his wife Vicki have six children and nineteen grandchildren.

References

External links

Larry McWilliams at Baseball Almanac
Larry McWilliams at Baseball Gauge

Atlanta Braves players
Pittsburgh Pirates players
St. Louis Cardinals players
Philadelphia Phillies players
Kansas City Royals players
Richmond Braves players
Major League Baseball pitchers
Baseball players from Wichita, Kansas
Paris Dragons baseball players
Living people
Year of birth missing (living people)